Martin Svensson may refer to:

 Martin Svensson (singer) (born 1978), Swedish singer, author and musician
 Martin Svensson (footballer) (born 1989), Danish footballer